Marcus R. Clark (born February 24, 1956) is a former Associate Justice of the Louisiana Supreme Court.

Early life and education 

Marcus R. Clark was born on February 24, 1956, in Sulphur, Louisiana to Gerald and Hilda Clark. He earned a Bachelor of Arts from University of Louisiana at Monroe in 1982 and his Juris Doctor from the Paul M. Hebert Law Center in 1985.

Legal career 

After graduating law school, he took a job with the Ouachita Parish District Attorney's Office and earned the title of Chief Felony Drug Prosecutor by 1990.

Law enforcement career 

From 1978–1982, he served as a Detective with the Ouachita Parish Sheriff's Office in Monroe.

State judicial career 

In 1997, he became a District Judge to the Fourth Judicial District Court. While a district judge he served as a Drug Court Judge from 2000-2001 and as Chief Judge from 2004–2006.

Louisiana Supreme Court service 

In 2009, Clark was elected to the Louisiana Supreme Court. In December 2019, Clark announced he was retiring effective June 30, 2020.

Personal life 

Clark is a registered Republican.

References

External links 

1956 births
Living people
20th-century American lawyers
21st-century American judges
American police officers
Louisiana lawyers
Louisiana Republicans
Louisiana state court judges
Louisiana State University Law Center alumni
Justices of the Louisiana Supreme Court
People from Sulphur, Louisiana
University of Louisiana at Monroe alumni